Kinilnat, or ensalada, is an Ilocano salad. Popular vegetables that are used as ingredients in this dish include the shoots and leaves of the sweet potato and bitter melon, the shoots and fruits of the string bean, and horseradish tree leaves and blossoms, taro, cabbage, blossoms of the West-Indian pea, and winged beans, fern shoots, or other various vegetables such as eggplant. The leaves, shoots, blossoms, or the other parts of the plant are blanched, drained and dressed with bagoong (preferably) or patis, and sometimes souring agents like calamansi or cherry tomatoes are added, as well as freshly ground ginger.

See also
Binagoongan
List of salads

References

Philippine cuisine
Salads
Vegetable dishes